Hólger Eduardo Matamoros Chunga (born January 4, 1985) is an Ecuadorian footballer who plays for C.D. El Nacional.

Club career

Club Deportivo Cuenca
Matamoros has been playing for Cuenca since 2006. He was part of the squad who participated in the Copa Libertadores 2006. He is known as a key player for Cuenca in recent days. In 2008, he played in the copa libertadores with Lanús, Estudiantes de La Plata, and Danubio F.C. He helped Cuenca achieve a win in the group stage against Estudiantes which finished 1-0 in Ecuador. Although they were eliminated in the group stage, they made a great performance for what was expected from them.
Matamoros has recently contributed numerous assists in Cuenca's magnificent run of form in the 2009 Libertadores edition. Placed in Group 2 with Boca Juniors, Deportivo Táchira, and Guaraní, they won all three home games, including a historic 1-0 victory over Boca. They are currently in the Round of 16 with Caracas FC. In the first leg against Caracas, Matamoros played a part in the assist on the final goal that helped win the match 2-1.

Barcelona Sporting Club

Matamoros played three seasons for BSC.

International career
Matamoros received his first call-up on August 4, 2009 for the upcoming friendly against Jamaica on August 12, 2009, where he made his debut in a 0-0 draw with the Caribbean team.

References

External links
 Hólger Matamoros at BDFA.com.ar 
 
 

1985 births
Living people
People from Machala
Ecuadorian footballers
Ecuador international footballers
C.D. Cuenca footballers
Barcelona S.C. footballers
L.D.U. Quito footballers
C.S. Emelec footballers
C.D. El Nacional footballers
Ecuadorian Serie A players
Association football midfielders